The World Professional Billiards and Snooker Association (WPBSA), the governing body for professional snooker, first introduced a ranking system for professional players in 1976, with the aim of seeding players for the World Snooker Championship. The reigning champion would be automatically seeded first, the losing finalist from the previous year seeded second, and the other seedings based on the ranking list. Initially the rankings were based on performances in the preceding three world championships, with five points for the winner, four for the runner-up, three for losing semi-finalists, two for losing quarter-finalists, and on for losers in the last 16 round. Following the 1982 World Snooker Championship, the Jameson International and the Professional Players Tournament which were open to all members of the WPBSA. These events carried points as per the previous system. Points for World Championship finishes were now worth double the previous tariff, with ten points for the winner, eight for the runner up, and so on. In the 1983–84 snooker season, the Lada Classic was added as a ranking tournament, and "merit points" were introduced. Merit points were awarded to players who were required to compete in qualifying rounds of ranking tournaments who reached the last 32, with a full merit point awarded if this was achieved in the world championship, and half a merit point otherwise. No points were awarded to a player who did not win any matches in a given tournament: for example, a top 16 player seeded into the last 32 of the world championship would not win any merit points if they lost their first match.

The tournaments that counted towards the 1984/1985 rankings were those which were open to all professional players over three seasons. These tournaments were the Jameson International Open 1982 and 1983, the Professional Players Tournament 1982 and 1983, the 1984 Lada Classic, and the 1982, 1983 and 1984 Embassy World Championships. Steve Davis was ranked first with 32 points, some way ahead of Tony Knowles in second place with 21, Cliff Thorburn (3rd, with 20) and Kirk Stevens (4th, with 19). John Virgo, who did not win any ranking points in the 1983–1984 season was the only player to lose their place in the top 16 from the previous year. Willie Thorne joined the top 16. The Coral Open and Dulux British Open were added for to the ranking list with effect from the 1984–85 season, which meant that performances in those events were taken into account for the 1985/1986 rankings. In the same season, due to changes in sponsors, the Professional Players Tournament became the Rothmans Grand Prix, and the Lada Classic became the Mercantile Credit Classic.

Points Tariff

Rankings 
The world rankings for the 61 professional snooker players in the 1984–85 season are listed below. In the table, numbers in parentheses indicate that the player earned merit points: one point in the world championships or half a point in the other ranking events.

References

1984
Rankings 1985
Rankings 1984